Shama is a 1976 Pakistani television series written by Fatima Surayya Bajia based on the novel Shama which was written by A.R Khatoon and directed by Qasim Jalali. It aired in 1976 on PTV the drama is now considered a cult classic.

Plot
The story revolves around a girl name Shama who lives with her maternal family after the death of her mother and has a close relationship with her grandmother.

Cast
 Syed Majid Ali as Mian Jee (Qamar's Grandfather)
 Ghazala Kaifee as Shama
 Jawed Sheikh as Mansoor
 Anwar Iqbal as Qamar
 Akbar Subhani as Tahir
 Rizwan Wasti as Akhtar Hussain
 Nafees Hassan as Kishwar Jahan (Shama's mother)
 Begum Khurshid Mirza as Shama's grandmother 
 Ishrat Hashmi as Halima (Qamar's mother) 
 Zaheen Tahira as Khursheed (Mansoor's mother)
 Qazi Wajid
 Arsh Muneer as Bua
 Akbar Subhani
 Nawab Kaifee as Amjad
 Subhani Ba Yunus
 Tasneem Rana as Shabbo

References

External links
 

1970s Pakistani television series
Pakistani drama television series
Pakistan Television Corporation original programming
Pakistani family television dramas
Pakistani television dramas based on novels
Urdu-language television shows